Thomas Tindal Fitchie (11 December 1881 – 17 October 1947) was a Scottish amateur football forward.

Career

Club
A talented forward, nicknamed the "Prince of Dribblers", Fitchie was born in Edinburgh and played football as an amateur (having had too many business commitments to commit to the game professionally). He appears to have travelled a lot, and his career was rather eclectic as a result; he played for a variety of clubs, and the dates of some of his tenures are not known.

Having started out at West Norwood, Fitchie joined Woolwich Arsenal when he was 19, in November 1901. He made his debut against Gainsborough Trinity in a Second Division match on 8 February 1902, and scored twice as Woolwich Arsenal rolled out 5–0 winners. However, being unable to fully commit to the team, he was only in the side intermittently. As an amateur he was free to play for other teams and often guested for other London sides, including Fulham, London Caledonians and even Tottenham Hotspur — two games, scoring one goal – but this dates to the period before Arsenal moved north to became Spurs' local rivals. However, it seems he played mostly for Woolwich Arsenal while he was in London. 

It wasn't until the 1904–05 season that he had any sort of decent run in the side, scoring six times in nine league games, Arsenal's first season in the First Division. He scored nine league goals in 1905–06 and played in an FA Cup semi-final the same season.

Fitchie left Arsenal in mid-1906 to return to his native Scotland, and played for Queen's Park for two years, having already featured for them a few times in 1905. He also spent some time in southern England during this period, occasionally appearing for Norwich City and Brighton & Hove Albion. He returned to Woolwich Arsenal in 1908 and played another full season there; he scored ten goals (nine in the league, one in the cup) in twenty-one games, making him Arsenal's top scorer for 1908–09; that season they finished sixth in the First Division, which remained their highest-finishing position until 1925–26. In all, he played 63 times for Arsenal and scored 30 goals.

After leaving Arsenal, Fitchie joined a touring team known as The Pilgrims, a side composed of British players that toured the United States in October and November 1909. After returning to England, Fitchie played for Glossop North End between 1909 and 1911, and for Fulham for a second spell in 1912.

International
Fitchie's ability was such that he was called up to play for Scotland on 6 March 1905, a 3–1 loss against Wales in Wrexham. He was Arsenal's first representative for that country, along with Bobby Templeton who played in the same match. In all Fitchie won four caps and scored once, the only goal of the game against Ireland on St Patrick's Day in 1906.

Personal life 
Fitchie served as a sergeant in the Argyll and Sutherland Highlanders during the First World War. A lung disorder contracted during his war service lead to his death in October 1947.

Career statistics

References

Sources

External links
 
 

1881 births
1947 deaths
Scottish footballers
Scotland international footballers
Association football inside forwards
Arsenal F.C. players
Glossop North End A.F.C. players
Fulham F.C. players
Tottenham Hotspur F.C. players
London Caledonians F.C. players
Queen's Park F.C. players
Norwich City F.C. players
Brighton & Hove Albion F.C. players
English Football League players
Scottish Football League players
West Norwood F.C. players
Footballers from Edinburgh
Argyll and Sutherland Highlanders soldiers
British Army personnel of World War I
Deaths from lung disease